Dalegarth railway station is the easterly terminus of the 15" gauge Ravenglass & Eskdale Railway in Cumbria, England. It has a café and shop for passengers, along with a run-round loop, turntable and siding for trains. It is located next to the Whillan Beck, a tributary of the River Esk flowing from the isolated Burnmoor Tarn.

History
The station has stood on this site since the mid-1920s, when it was moved from in front of the nearby miners' cottages (now home to employees of the railway). In the days of the 3' gauge line, the station was at Boot, but soon after the conversion of the final stretch to 15" gauge, it became apparent that the miniature locomotives could not cope with the gradient, and the line was diverted to the current station, which is on the route of a late-Victorian mine branch from the cottages to Gill Force, across the River Esk. The former route to Boot can still be seen and walked.

For about 80 years, the station building was a converted second-hand hut from the weapons testing establishment at Eskmeals near Ravenglass. The current building, utilising its railway embankment site to create a split-level layout with an education/meeting suite below the main café and shop area, was opened on 21 April 2007 by music producer and railway enthusiast Pete Waterman. At the climax of the Cumbria shootings in 2010, passengers had to remain within the station building under armed guard.

Present Day

Today, the station houses the Fellbites Eatery and Scafell Gift Shop (which also acts as a booking office) that are open when the railway are running scheduled passenger trains, where locomotives can be seen detaching from the rolling stock and coupling onto the other end for the return journey to Ravenglass. Scafell Gift Shop has a range of products similar to that of Ravenglass. The station has two platforms with a turntable at the Eastern extremity of the line and a water tank at the Western end of platform 1.

The station grounds also have amenities such as toilets and paid car parking on site, with 2 free electric car charge points. Boot village is a 5-minute walk from the station, and has a restored water mill together with the Boot Inn and Brook House Inn.

Accessibility
Wheelchair passengers should reserve a wheelchair space prior to the day of travel, so that the railway can accommodate such passengers.

Gallery

References

Heritage railway stations in Cumbria
Ravenglass and Eskdale Railway
Railway stations in Great Britain opened in 1876
Borough of Copeland